Bonet  is a surname.  Notable people with the name include:

Antoni Bonet i Castellana, Catalan architect
Antonio Bonet Silvestre, Spanish football player and coach
Arturo Bonet, Spanish chess master
Carlos Bonet, Paraguayan footballer
Carlos Bonnet, Venezuelan composer, orchestra conductor, and militar
Carlos Carmona Bonet, Spanish footballer
Deni Bonet, US-born singer/songwriter, electric violinist, and multi-instrumentalist
Francisco Bonet Serrano, Spanish footballer
Honoré Bonet, Provençal Benedictine
Gaston Bonet-Maury, French Protestant historian
Jaume Bonet, Catalan football coach
Jean Bonet, French scholar of Vietnamese
Jean Pierre François Bonet, a French military commander
John Bonet, English politician
Jordi Bonet, Catalan-Canadian artist
Jose Antonio Ortega Bonet, Cuban businessman
José Bonet Solves, Spanish mathematician
José Moré Bonet, Catalan footballer
Joseph Bonet de Treyches, French politician
Josep Maria Bonet, Catalan master glassmaker
Juan Pablo Bonet, Spanish priest and educator
Juan-Julio Bonet Sugrañes, Catalan chemist
Kadhja Bonet, American singer
Lisa Bonet (born 1967), American actress
Lluís Guillermo Mas Bonet, Majorcan racing cyclist
Maria del Mar Bonet, Majorcan singer
María Luisa Bonet, Spanish computer scientist
Nai Bonet, Vietnamese belly-dancer, singer and film actress
Nicolas Bonet, French theologian
Paula Bonet, Spanish book illustrator and urban mural painter
Pilar Bonet (born 1952), Spanish journalist and writer
Roberto Bonet, Paraguayan footballer

See also
 Bonnet (surname)

Catalan-language surnames